Triplophysa alexandrae is a species of stone loach in the genus Triplophysa endemic to Sichuan, China.

Etymology
The fish is named in honor of Alexandra Viktorovna Potanina (1843-1893), the wife and traveling companion of Grigory Nikolayaevich Potanin (1835-1920), a Russian explorer of Central Asia.

References

alexandrae
Freshwater fish of China
Endemic fauna of Sichuan
Taxa named by Artem Mikhailovich Prokofiev
Fish described in 2001